Justen is both a surname and a given name. Notable people with the name include:

Christel Justen (1957–2005), German swimmer
Marçal Justen Filho (born 1955), Brazilian lawyer and jurist
Justen Glad (born 1997), American soccer player

See also 
 Justan (disambiguation)
 Justin (disambiguation)
 Juston (disambiguation)
 Justyn (disambiguation)

Surnames from given names